The A133 road runs between Colchester and Clacton-on-Sea. One end is at Cymbeline Way in Lexden, from where the road runs through the Avenue of Remembrance,  bypassing Colchester town centre. It also runs past Wivenhoe Park, through Elmstead Market, Frating Green, meeting a spur from the A120 road at Great Bentley. The road by-passes Weeley, Weeley Heath, Little Clacton, Great Clacton ending in Clacton on Sea.

The A133 stretch within Colchester was formerly the A12

Sources 
 Google Maps

Roads in England
Roads in Essex